Eduardo Santiago Tercero Méndez (born 6 May 1996) is a Mexican professional footballer who plays as a defender for Liga MX club Tigres UANL.

Honours
Tigres UANL
Liga MX: Clausura 2019
CONCACAF Champions League: 2020

References

External links

Eduardo Tercero at Debut Liga MX (AS Mexico)
Eduardo Tercero at Team Debut 
Eduardo Tercero at Lobos BUAP Profile

Living people
1996 births
Mexican footballers
Association football central defenders
Lobos BUAP footballers
Tigres UANL footballers
Liga MX players
Ascenso MX players
Tercera División de México players
Footballers from Mexico City